Fabian Aloysius O'Dea,  (January 20, 1918 – December 12, 2004) was a Newfoundland and Canadian lawyer and the fourth lieutenant governor of Newfoundland.

Family
He was the son of John V. O'Dea and May (Coady) O'Dea. In 1950, O'Dea married Constance Margaret (Peggy) Ewing. They had four children; Deborah (1951), Victoria (Viki) (1953), Stephen (1954) and Jane (1956).

Life and career
Born in St. John's, O'Dea was educated at St. Bonaventure's College, Memorial University of Newfoundland (MUN), University of Toronto, Dalhousie University and Christ Church, Oxford.

In 1939, he was selected Rhodes Scholar for Newfoundland, but delayed going to Oxford in order to join the Royal Canadian Naval Volunteer Reserve, where he served as torpedo officer.

In 1945, when he retired from the reserve he attended Oxford for a BCL degree and was admitted to the English Bar at the Inner Temple in 1948.

In 1949, O'Dea was made honorary aide-de-camp to the Governor General of Canada. From 1949 to 1961 he was aide-de-camp to the Lieutenant Governor of Newfoundland and Labrador. In 1963 O'Dea became Lieutenant Governor of Newfoundland and Labrador and a QC.

O'Dea was a member of the Board of Regents for MUN, Vice-President for Newfoundland at the Canadian Bar Association and a member of the Canadian Rhodes Scholarship selection committee. Fabian O'Dea was also a collector of sixteenth to eighteenth century maps of Newfoundland and Labrador.

John R. O'Dea was the brother of Fabian O'Dea. Brian O'Dea was Fabian O'Dea's nephew.

Awards and honours
O'Dea's awards include:

 1963 Knight of Grace of St. John of Jerusalem
 1969 LL.D by Memorial University of Newfoundland
 1988 Knight of Malta
 1990 Knight of Justice of St. John of Jerusalem

References

External links
Biography at Government House The Governorship of Newfoundland and Labrador

1918 births
2004 deaths
Members of the Inner Temple
Canadian King's Counsel
Memorial University of Newfoundland alumni
Dalhousie University alumni
University of Toronto alumni
Canadian people of Irish descent
Knights of Malta
Lieutenant Governors of Newfoundland and Labrador
People from St. John's, Newfoundland and Labrador
Royal Canadian Navy officers
Newfoundland Rhodes Scholars
Alumni of Christ Church, Oxford